Philip Austin may refer to:

 Philip E. Austin (born 1942), President of the University of Connecticut
 Philip Austin (Gaelic footballer) (born 1986), Irish Gaelic football player
 Phil Austin (1941–2015), comedian and writer

See also 
 Phillip Austin (born 1969), British murderer